Morgan Matthews (born May 21, 1987) is an American former competitive ice dancer. With Maxim Zavozin, she is the 2006 Four Continents silver medalist and 2005 World Junior champion.

Personal life 
Matthews was born May 21, 1987, in Chicago. She settled in Boston in May 2010. An economics major, she graduated from Wellesley College in May 2016.

Career 
Early in her career, Matthews competed in pair skating. In 1999 she and partner Val Rising-Moore placed 5th in the novice pairs event at U.S. Nationals.

Matthews teamed up with Maxim Zavozin in 2001. The ice dancing duo became the 2003 and 2004 U.S. junior champions and went on to capture the 2005 World Junior title. They won the pewter medal at the 2006 U.S. Championships and were sent to the 2006 Four Continents where they won silver. The next season, they placed fifth at the 2007 U.S. Championships. Matthews and Zavozin announced the end of their partnership on February 26, 2007.

Matthews teamed up with Canadian Leif Gislason. They intended to represent Canada but Matthews' request for a release was denied by U.S. Figure Skating. Their partnership ended after two years and a 5th-place finish at U.S. Nationals. She began a partnership with Elliot Pennington, who last competed in 2005 with Jane Summersett.

Matthews had hip injuries due to a macerated labrum, acetabular dysplasia, and vascular necrosis. This led to her competitive retirement, in September 2009. In 2010, she joined the coaching staff at The Skating Club of Boston.

Programs 
(with Zavozin)

Competitive highlights 
GP: Grand Prix; JGP: Junior Grand Prix

With Gislason

With Zavozin

References

External links 

 
 Matthews / Zavozin official site

1987 births
American female ice dancers
Living people
Figure skaters from Chicago
Four Continents Figure Skating Championships medalists
World Junior Figure Skating Championships medalists
21st-century American women